Brian van Mentz (died 26 April 1941) was a Royal Air Force officer and World War II flying ace.

Early life and education
Born in Johannesburg, South Africa, he attended school in England.

Career
Van Mentz joined the Reserve of Air Force Officers (RAFO) on a short service commission in 1937 after training at 4 Elementary & Reserve Flying Training School. After a brief induction, he was commissioned Acting Pilot Officer from 24 November 1937. He then went to 8 Flying School on 11 December, before joining 213 Squadron in July 1938 at RAF Wittering, flying the Gauntlet Mk II.

In September 1938 his commission with the RAFO came to an end and he was granted a short service commission on 19 October; he remained with 213 Squadron. In January 1939, 213 Squadron started receiving its first Hawker Hurricanes to replace the Gauntlets.

In May 1940 van Mentz joined 504 (County of Nottingham) Squadron, a Hurricane squadron stationed at RAF Debden, but deployed to France. His first confirmed victory was on 14 May 1940, destroying a Junkers Ju 88 near the Albert Canal. This was followed by another confirmed and one unconfirmed on 15 May.

On returning from France van Mentz moved to 222 Squadron, which was a Spitfire squadron. During the summer of 1940 he claimed three more victories and in October was awarded the Distinguished Flying Cross. His DFC citation credits him with 6 victories:
F/O Van Mentz has been engaged in operations against the enemy since the outbreak of war. He has destroyed six enemy aircraft and probably a further three, two of which were shot down during the period of intensive operations in France. This officer has led his section, and at times his flight, with skill and courage and has shown great determination in pressing home his attacks against large enemy formations.

On 30 October 1940 he damaged a Messerschmitt Bf 109 and on 30 November he destroyed a Dornier 17. Three days after receiving his DFC, he recorded the probable destruction of a Junkers Ju 88. This was followed by one enemy aircraft damaged on 2 February and one shared  victory on 18 March.

Death
On Saturday 26 April 1941, members of 222 Squadron, including van Mentz, went to the Ferry Inn, a popular pub near Horning. Three bombs fell nearby, one falling on the pub at 9.46pm. Van Mentz was one of 21 people killed in the blast.

Van Mentz was buried in Brookwood Military Cemetery.

References

1941 deaths
Recipients of the Distinguished Flying Cross (United Kingdom)
South African World War II flying aces
The Few
Burials at Brookwood Cemetery
Royal Air Force pilots of World War II
Van
Deaths by airstrike during World War II
Royal Air Force officers
People from Johannesburg